Matthew J. Hernandez (born October 16, 1961) is a former American football offensive tackle who played two seasons in the National Football League (NFL) with the Seattle Seahawks and Minnesota Vikings. He was drafted by the Seahawks in the eighth round of the 1983 NFL Draft. He played college football at Purdue.

Early years and college career
Hernandez attended East Detroit High School in Eastpointe, Michigan.

He lettered for the Purdue Boilermakers of Purdue University from 1980 to 1982. He earned Second-team All-Big Ten honors his senior year in 1982.

Professional career
Hernandez was selected by the Seattle Seahawks with the 210th pick in the 1983 NFL Draft. He played in eight games, starting one, for the Seahawks during the 1983 season. He was released by the Seahawks on August 28, 1984.

Hernandez signed with the Minnesota Vikings on September 12, 1984. He played in thirteen games for the Vikings in 1984. Hernandez left Vikings training camp in 1985.

References

External links
Just Sports Stats

Living people
1961 births
Players of American football from Detroit
American football offensive tackles
Purdue Boilermakers football players
Seattle Seahawks players
Minnesota Vikings players